Wálter Daniel Mantegazza González (17 June 1952 – 20 June 2006) was a professional footballer who was part of the Uruguayan Squad at the World Cup in Germany in 1974. He played as a midfielder.

Career
Born in Montevideo, Mantegazza began playing football with local club Nacional. He also played for Mexican sides Club León and Tigres de la UANL, helping Tigres win their first Mexican Primera División title in 1977–78.

References

External links

1952 births
2006 deaths
Uruguayan footballers
Uruguayan expatriate footballers
Uruguay international footballers
1974 FIFA World Cup players
Uruguayan Primera División players
Liga MX players
Club Nacional de Football players
Club León footballers
Tigres UANL footballers
Expatriate footballers in Mexico
Uruguayan expatriate sportspeople in Mexico

Association football midfielders
Uruguayan people of Italian descent